Switch is an American action-adventure detective series starring Robert Wagner and Eddie Albert. It was broadcast on the CBS network for three seasons between September 9, 1975, and August 27, 1978, bumping the Hawaii Five-O detective series to Friday nights.

Background
Switch was inspired by the 1973 movie The Sting and was similar to  The Rockford Files, which had debuted a year earlier.  It was created by Glen A. Larson; in his memoir, The Garner Files, Rockford Files star James Garner accuses Larson of essentially rewriting Rockford scripts without authorization for use on this show.  Donald P. Bellisario was also one of the writers.

The series focused on two main characters, Frank MacBride (Eddie Albert) and Pete Ryan (Robert Wagner). MacBride was a retired bunco cop who once arrested Ryan, a con man. After Ryan's release from prison, the two men opened a detective agency in Los Angeles. Their speciality involves the use of confidence tricks to trap criminals into revealing evidence of their guilt. Assisting them is another reformed con man, restaurant owner Malcolm Argos (Charlie Callas), and Maggie Philbin (Sharon Gless), Mac and Pete's naive-but-competent receptionist and assistant.

The series pilot for CBS aired on March 21, 1975, as a 90-minute made-for-television movie. During the second season, the series became more serious in tone and more of a traditional crime drama. William Bryant joined the cast as Lt. Shilton in season two, and Mindi Miller and James Hong joined the cast in season three. In the third season, Pete moves into an apartment above Malcolm's bar.

The modestly successful show was put on hiatus in early 1978, its time slot taken by The Incredible Hulk. The remaining 10 unaired episodes were broadcast the following summer before the series was cancelled in August due to low ratings.

Episodes

Cast

Eddie Albert and Robert Wagner are the only actors to appear in every episode. Sharon Gless appeared in all but three episodes, and Charlie Callas did not appear in four episodes during the run.

In addition, Anne Archer recurred in the first season as Laurie, a grifter who helps Mac and Pete with their sting operations (clips of the actress in character appeared in the opening credits sequence during the first and second seasons).

Legacy
The short-lived 1976–1977 ABC crime drama The Feather and Father Gang was seen as an unsuccessful attempt to imitate Switch. Coincidentally, Wagner later costarred with one of the stars of The Feather and Father Gang, Stefanie Powers, in another crime drama Hart to Hart which ran for five seasons beginning in 1979.

See also
 McCoy, a similarly themed TV series that also debuted in 1975

References

External links
 

1975 American television series debuts
1978 American television series endings
CBS original programming
1970s American crime television series
Television series by Universal Television
Television shows set in Los Angeles
Television series created by Glen A. Larson
American detective television series